Vice Admiral G. S. Pabby is a former Flag Officer in the Indian Navy. He last served as the Chief of Materiel.

Early life and education
Vice Admiral GS Pabby is a graduate with an honours degree in the field of Mechanical Engineering from NIT, Kurukshetra. He completed his Master of Technology from Indian Institute of Technology Bombay (IITB) in Systems and Controls specialization. He has been recognised as a Distinguished Alumnus by IIT(Mumbai) and NIT Kurukshetra. He attended the Naval War College and College of Defence Management.

Career
Pabby was commissioned into the Indian Navy in August 1980. While working in the Mumbai Naval dockyard, he was included in the infrastructure planning and creation team.

Pabby was appointed as the Chief Staff Officer ( Technical) at Western Naval Command after being promoted to the rank of Rear Admiral in December 2009. He was later moved to Visakhapatnam Naval Dockyard where he took over the assignment of the Admiral Superintendent of Naval Dockyard. He supervised  major refits and weapon system upgrades of many ships and Russian submarines. Later Pabby was appointed as the Director General of Naval Projects (Mumbai), where he steered the construction of new dry dock.

In his prior appointments, Pabby served as a flag officer and has been the controller for the production and acquisition of warships. In order to encourage the Indian industries into the construction of ship equipment and submarines, the admiral interacted with many industries and other professional bodies mainly focusing the micro, small and medium enterprises and was instrumental in revising policies and guidelines.

He has been awarded the Vishisht Seva Medal, the Ati Vishisht Seva Medal and Param Vishisht Seva Medals for his distinguished service. The admiral became Chief of Materiel of the Indian Navy on 31 October 2016.

Awards and Decoration

Gallery

References

Living people
Year of birth missing (living people)
Place of birth missing (living people)
Indian Navy admirals
IIT Bombay alumni
Recipients of the Ati Vishisht Seva Medal
Recipients of the Vishisht Seva Medal
Chiefs of Materiel (India)
College of Defence Management alumni
Naval War College, Goa alumni